Acid orange 20 (also Orange I) is an organic compound and an azo dye.  It is one of the first water soluble dyes to be commercialized, and one of seven original food dyes allowed under the U.S. Pure Food and Drug Act of June 30, 1906. It is analyzed by HPLC.

Use and discontinuation
At one time it was a popular food colorant but it was delisted in 1959 in the U.S.

In the early 1950s, after several cases were reported of sickness in children who had eaten Halloween candy colored with the dye, the FDA conducted new, more thorough and rigorous testing on food dyes. Orange 1 was outlawed for food use in 1956.

Related compounds
Orange II (Acid Orange 7), an isomer

References

Food colorings
Azo dyes
Acid dyes